The  Party for the Economic Independence of Burundi (PIEBU)  is a small political party in Burundi.

Political parties in Burundi